Pacific State Medical University, formerly known as VSMU (Vladivostok State Medical University) is a university in Vladivostok in the Far East of Russia.

At the beginning, since 1956 VSMU was the Medical Faculty of the Far Eastern State University, but in 2 years it became Vladivostok State Medical Institute (VSMU). Institute was re

organized into the university in 1995, in 2013 the university was renamed and reorganized into Pacific State Medical University.

Faculties of the Pacific State Medical University:
 The Medical Faculty
 The Military Faculty
 The Military Training Center
 The Pediatric Faculty
 The Faculty of Pharmacy
 The Faculty of Medical Prophylactic and Medical Biochemistry
 The Pharmaceutical Faculty
 The Stomatological (dental) Faculty
 The Higher Nursing Education and Social Work Faculty
 The Clinical Psychology Faculty
 The Continuous Medical Education
 The Postgraduate and Further Degree Studies
 Pre-University Training

PSMU today
Today PSMU - is a various scientific and educational institution that includes 10 faculties and 67 departments, employing 85 doctors and 285 candidates of science. The university held an internship, residency, graduate school, the system of pre-university training and post-graduate special education improving system, that make possible to obtain any medical profession.

References

External links

Pacific State Medical University official website 

Universities in Vladivostok
Universities and institutes established in the Soviet Union
1958 establishments in the Soviet Union
Medical schools in Russia
Educational institutions established in 1958